The Women's team tennis competition was held at the 2010 Asian Games. Chinese Taipei were the defending champions, but lost to China in the Final.

Each tie is the best of three rubbers, two singles and one doubles match.

Schedule
All times are China Standard Time (UTC+08:00)

Results

1st round

Quarterfinals

Semifinals

Final

Non-participating athletes

References

External links
Draw

Tennis at the 2010 Asian Games